Ilford EMU Depot is a traction maintenance depot located in Ilford, Greater London, England. The depot is situated on the Great Eastern Main Line and is on the north side of the line to the east of Ilford station, between that station and Seven Kings railway station.

Within the site is a sixteen-road shed operated by Greater Anglia for train maintenance of British Rail Class 321 units. British Rail Class 379 units were maintained by Bombardier on one of the roads with British Rail Class 360 units maintained by Siemens on another road. On introduction of British Rail Class 710 and British Rail Class 720 Alstom Aventra in 2019/20 all maintenance staff and facilities were transferred to Bombardier. A six-road overhaul and refurbishment shed is present, with three being electrified for light maintenance and exam work for the class 345 Aventra and  Bombardier Electrostar. A wheel lathe is present.

The site is used for train stabling and maintenance by Greater Anglia, Elizabeth line, London Overground and Alstom.

The depot code is IL.

History
Until a remodel, as part of Crossrail works, in 2016 Ilford had four sheds, the first two of which were opened in 1949 for DC EMUs, and converted to AC in 1960. These were a six-track with four through-roads shed, and a three-road dead-ended shed. The third building is the largest, opened in 1960 for AC EMUs, being a sixteen-road dead-ended shed. The fourth building is a one-track through-road shed which was opened around 2000.

Around 1987, the depot's allocation included classes 302, 305, 306, 307, 308 and 315 EMUs.

Until 1947 the Fairlop Loop ran, via the northern perimeter of the yard, from Ilford railway station to Woodford tube station.

In 2021, a carriage washing machine was installed. It began operation in September following an investment of £1.2 million.

Allocation 
As of 2023, the depot's main rolling stock allocation consists of Greater Anglia Class 321 and  London Overground Class 710 Elizabeth line Class 345 EMUs.

In 2023, there were two Class 08s on site used for shunting purposes. Both of these are contracted to Alstom and, while 08 700 is owned by Harry Needle Railroad Company, 08 573 is owned by RMS Locotec.

References

Bibliography 

Railway depots in London
Transport in the London Borough of Redbridge